Center channel refers to an audio channel common to many surround sound formats. It is the channel that is mostly, or fully, dedicated to the reproduction of the dialogue of an audiovisual program. The speaker(s) connected to the center channel are placed in the center of and behind the perforated projection screen, to give the effect that sounds from the center channel are coming from the screen. In many home surround sound units, the center channel is positioned above or below the video screen.

In the post-production process of filmmaking and video production sound editing, dialogue can be mapped to other speakers when story action and direction require it, such as when the person talking is off-screen, but it is rare that there is vocal content that is completely absent from the center channel.

In material without accompanying visuals (e.g. music), the center channel simply reproduces sound intended to come from immediately in front of the listener, which usually includes the lead vocals, which are rarely panned hard left or right. 

The center channel also anchors the sound field, eliminating phantom images such as those that plagued quadraphonic sound if the speakers were not precisely placed.

The center channel eliminates the need of creating a phantom center with left and right stereo speakers. The center channel provides image stabling effects and is considered the most important channel for film production.

History

The need for a center speaker to locate screen-centered sounds has been recognised since the Bell labs experiments in stereo sound from the 1930s, and multi-channel cinema sound systems, starting with the first commercial stereophonic film (Fantasia-1941) have always included one. Post-war stereo sound in theaters initially came from separate magnetic film reproducers synchronised to the picture, but in the 1950s systems using magnetic stripes on the film itself came into use. Cinemascope used four such tracks (left, center, right and surround), and the subsequent Todd-AO 70mm system used six (left, left-center, center, right-center and right, plus a single surround channel). Unfortunately these magnetic systems were not only very expensive, but were also unreliable and so were little used, the industry preferring to stay with the tried, tested (and cheap) mono optical track.

Dolby Stereo was introduced by Dolby Laboratories in 1975. It divided the existing soundtrack area of a 35mm film print into two, allowing a two-channel recording. Each of these two channels used Dolby A type noise reduction (later replaced by Dolby SR type). In addition a matrix, similar in principle to those used for the existing matrix-type quadraphonic systems, allowed the audio for left, center and right speakers, plus a single surround channel to be carried by the two tracks. Thus Dolby Stereo provided a similar stereo performance to that previously only available in the cinema by the magnetic tracks on 4-track Cinemascope or 6-track Todd-AO (70mm) formats, but at far lower cost. 

Dolby Pro Logic is the name used for the Dolby Stereo matrix when used in home theater systems.

In recent years digital multi-channel sound systems, such as Dolby Digital and DTS, have become available which provide 6 or 8 discrete audio channels providing for not only the usual three screen speakers but also 2 or 4 groups of surround speakers and a sub-woofer.

Center focus or dialog enhancement
Many of the home theater units have a "center focus" or "dialog enhancement" option that provides options for the dialogue reproduction, as well as the overall content mapped to the center and front channels. Common setting include modes that map dialogue strictly to the center channel (to the best ability of the decoder), modes that emphasize vocals for clear dialogue—and modes that mix the center and front channels, mapping some vocals to the front channels, and some non-vocal audio content to the center channel. It may also simply raise the volume level of the center channel. DTS:X processing may include "Dialog Control", the ability to isolate and control dialog levels independent of other ambient noises.

Rear/back center channel

6.1 channel surround systems such as Dolby Pro Logic IIx, Dolby Digital EX and DTS-ES use a single rear surround channel in addition to the traditional left and right surround channels.

References

 
Loudspeakers
Audio players
Film sound production
Sound technology
Surround sound